Anthony Jean Herve Mahoungou (born 12 February 1994) is a French professional gridiron football wide receiver for the Rhein Fire of the European League of Football (ELF). He most recently played for the Ottawa Redblacks of the Canadian Football League (CFL). He has also played for the Philadelphia Eagles of the National Football League (NFL), the Frankfurt Universe of the German Football League (GFL), and the Frankfurt Galaxy of the ELF.

He played college football for the Purdue Boilermakers and has been a member of the France national team.

Honours
Foster Farms Bowl: 2017

ELF Champion: 2021

References

External links
Ottawa Redblacks bio

1994 births
Living people
French players of American football
Frankfurt Galaxy (ELF) players
Philadelphia Eagles players
German Football League players
French expatriate sportspeople in Germany
French expatriate sportspeople in the United States
Ottawa Redblacks players
Sportspeople from Paris
European League of Football players
Purdue Boilermakers football players
West Hills Falcons football players